Lieutenant General Joseph Henry Smith (born 9 January 1945) is the Ambassador of Ghana to the United States.  Smith was the Minister for Defence of Ghana during President John Atta Mills' term of office from 2009 to 2013. He is also a former Chief of Army Staff of the Ghana Army.

Early life and education
Joseph Smith was born on 9 January 1945 in Takoradi. studied at the Achimota School in the Greater Accra Region of Ghana between 1959 and 1963 where he completed the West African School Certificate. He enrolled as an officer cadet at the Ghana Military Academy. He was commissioned 2/Lt on 16th October, 1965 into the Ghana Army Engineer Corps.

Military career
Smith was commissioned as a Second Lieutenant in October 1965 with the Ghana Army Engineer Corps. He rose through the years and became the Commandant of the Military Academy and Training School at Teshie, Accra in 1993. From 1993 to 1996, he was the Commander of the Second Infantry Brigade Group (now known as the Northern Command) with headquarters at Kumasi in the Ashanti Region of Ghana. While in this position, he was appointed Special Task Force Commander to restore law and order in Northern Ghana between January and September 1994 during the Konkomba and Nanumba conflict. In 1996, Smith served as the Company Commander of the United Nations Emergency Force (UNEF) in Egypt. He was appointed Chief of Staff of the Ghana Army in 1996 by President Jerry Rawlings. He held this position till 2001. Smith is the only Army Commander to have commanded three formations including two Infantry Brigade Groups. He retired from the military in February 2009 after 39 years.

Other work
After leaving the army, Smith worked as the chairman of the Board of Directors of the National Insurance Commission before going into politics in 2009.

Politics
In February 2009, Smith was appointed Minister for Defence by President John Atta Mills, a position he held till 2012.

President John Dramani Mahama replaced Smith with Hon. Mark Owen Woyongo as the Minister for Defence.

Personal life
Smith is twice married. He has three children from his first marriage and two from his current marriage with Douha Smith. He has a younger brother, Emmanuel Victor Smith who used to be spokesperson for Ex President Jerry Rawlings and also was one time Ghana Ambassador the United Kingdom.

Honours

 Smith was awarded the Companion of the Order of the Volta, one of Ghana's highest awards in 2001.
Legion of Merit” (USA) the fifth Highest Award in the US Army.
National Award – Ghana/UN Peace Keeping.
The State of Texas, USA, honored with the title “Admiral in the Texas Navy.
International Award – UN Peace Keeping Operations in the Sinai, Egypt.

References

External source
Lt Gen Smith on official Ghana government website

Living people
1945 births
Ghanaian soldiers
Alumni of Achimota School
Defence ministers of Ghana
National Democratic Congress (Ghana) politicians
Ambassadors of Ghana to the United States
Recipients of the Order of the Volta
Chiefs of Army Staff (Ghana)
Cabinet Ministers of Ghana